Deba may refer to:

Geography 
 Deba (crater), a crater on Mars
 Deba (river), a river in the Basque Country
 Deba, Gipuzkoa, a town in the Basque Country
 Deba, Gombe, a town in the Yamaltu/Deba Local Government Area of Gombe State, Nigeria

People
 Deba Prasad Das (1932–1986), Indian dancer
 Deba Gupta (1911–1930), Bengali revolutionary
 Deba Wieland (1916–1992), German journalist
 Bizunesh Deba (born 1987), Ethiopian long-distance runner
 Melvine Deba (born 1998), French handballer

Other 
 Deba (moth), a genus of moths of the family Crambidae
 Deba bōchō, a Japanese-style kitchen knife

See also
 Dęba (disambiguation)
 Deva (disambiguation)